In mathematics, a function f of n variables 

x1, ..., xn 

leads to a Chisini mean M if for every vector <x1, ..., xn>, there exists a unique M such that 

f(M,M, ..., M) = f(x1,x2, ..., xn).

The arithmetic, harmonic, geometric, generalised, Heronian and quadratic means are all Chisini means, as are their weighted variants.

They were introduced by Oscar Chisini in 1929.

See also 
 Fréchet mean
 Generalized mean
 Jensen's inequality
 Quasi-arithmetic mean
 Stolarsky mean

References

Mathematical analysis
Means